First Class Thieves is a Croatian comedy film directed by Fadil Hadžić. It was released in 2005.

Cast
 Goran Grgić - Dramski Prvak
 Emir Hadžihafizbegović - Producent
 Mladen Vulić - Pacino
 Franjo Dijak - Glumac
 Boro Stjepanović - Upravitelj Zatvora
 Ksenija Marinković - Psihologica
 Marinko Prga - Guja
 Janko Rakos - Djoni Bomba
 Boris Miholjević - Antoaneta
 Božidar Smiljanić - Drzavni Lopov
 Predrag 'Predjo' Vusović - Placenik
 Zlatan Zuhrić-Zuhra - Vratar
 Katarina Bistrović-Darvas - Novinarka
 Danko Ljustina - Divlji kapitalista
 Vedran Mlikota - Policajac
 Vanda Božić - Veronika

External links
 

2005 films
2000s Croatian-language films
2005 comedy films
Films directed by Fadil Hadžić
Croatian comedy films